This article describes the qualifying of the 2017–18 Women's EHF Champions League.

Draw
The draw was held on 29 June 2016 at 11:00 in Vienna, Austria. The eight teams were split in two groups and played a semifinal and final to determine the last participants. Matches were played on 9 and 10 September 2016.

Seedings
The seedings were announced on 27 June 2017.

Qualification tournament 1

Vipers Kristiansand hosted the tournament.

Bracket

Semifinals

Third place game

Final

Qualification tournament 2

Thüringer HC hosted the tournament.

Bracket

Semifinals

Third place game

Final

References

External links
Official website

Qualifying